Takave Budruk is a village and gram panchayat in Mawal taluka of Pune district in the state of Maharashtra, India.

Administration
The village is administrated by a sarpanch, an elected representative who leads a gram panchayat. At the time of the 2011 Census of India, the village was the headquarters for the eponymous gram panchayat, which also governed the villages of Belaj and Phalane.

Demographics
At the 2011 census, the village comprised 829 households. The population of 4143 was split between 2188 males and 1955 females.

See also
List of villages in Mawal taluka

References

Villages in Mawal taluka
Gram Panchayats in Pune district